Come Tomorrow may refer to:

Come Tomorrow (album) by Dave Matthews Band
"Come Tomorrow" (Barbra Streisand and Barry Gibb song), 2005
"Come Tomorrow", a song by Chicane from the album Somersault
"Come Tomorrow" (Marie Knight song), a song by Marie Knight, later a hit for the band Manfred Mann
"Come Tomorrow", a 1970 song by the British band Vanity Fare